The New York Islanders are a professional ice hockey team based in Uniondale, New York, United States. They are members of the Metropolitan Division of the National Hockey League's (NHL) Eastern Conference. The Islanders franchise has been a part of the NHL since their inception in 1972, playing their home games at Nassau Veterans Memorial Coliseum, at the Barclays Center, and at UBS Arena. Nearly 500 players have played for the team for at least one regular season or playoff game, and nearly 20 have had multiple stints over the years.

The Islanders have won the Stanley Cup four consecutive times (1980, 1981, 1982, and 1983), with a total of 32 players playing for the team throughout those four wins. Sixteen players (Mike Bossy, Bob Bourne, Clark Gillies, Butch Goring, Anders Kallur, Gord Lane, Dave Langevin, Wayne Merrick, Ken Morrow, Bob Nystrom, Stefan Persson, Denis Potvin, Billy Smith, Duane Sutter, John Tonelli and Bryan Trottier) have been a part of all four Cup wins, and three more (Billy Carroll, Mike McEwen and Roland Melanson) have won three with the team. The Islanders have retired eight numbers: 5 (Denis Potvin), 9 (Clark Gillies), 19 (Bryan Trottier), 22 (Mike Bossy), 23 (Bob Nystrom), 27 (John Tonelli), 31 (Billy Smith) and 91 (Butch Goring).

Fifteen players have captained the team, beginning with Ed Westfall. Denis Potvin holds the record for the longest captaincy period, as he led the team from 1979 to 1987. The shortest captaincy period was held by Bryan McCabe, who only served for 56 regular season games. There have been two seasons where the Islanders did not have a captain: 1996–97 and 2000–01. The team's current captain is Anders Lee, who was appointed on October 4, 2018, succeeding John Tavares, who signed with the Toronto Maple Leafs in the 18-19 offseason.


Key
 Won a Stanley Cup with the Islanders

Goaltenders
In the Islanders' inaugural season, three goaltenders played for the team: Billy Smith, Gerry Desjardins and Gerry Gray. Since then, 40 others have played in at least one regular season or playoff game. Smith stayed with the Islanders through 1989 and played in 675 regular season games and 132 playoff games, the most in the team's history. Additionally, he holds the records for most overall wins, with 304. Chico Resch has recorded the most shutouts with 25. Only fourteen have played in Islanders playoff games and of those, three have been on the roster during a Stanley Cup victory.

Skaters
In the 41 NHL seasons between 1972 and 2013, 457 skaters have played for the Islanders, from 18 different countries. Bryan Trottier has played the most games (1,123) and also holds the record for most assists (853) and points (1,353). On the other end of the spectrum, 23 players have only played one regular season game. The record for most penalty minutes is held by Mick Vukota with 1,879 minutes while the record for most goals is held by Mike Bossy, who scored 573 goals over a ten-year time period. Bossy is one of 32 players who have been with the team during at least one of their four Stanley Cup victories.

Notes

 Save percentage did not become an official NHL statistic until the 1982–83 season.  Therefore, goaltenders who only played before 1982 do not have official save percentages.
The "Seasons" column lists the first year of the season of the player's first game and the last year of the season of the player's last game. For example, a player who played one game in the 2000–01 season would be listed as playing with the team from 2000–01, regardless of what calendar year the game occurred within.
Statistics are complete as of the end of the 2014–15 NHL season and only reflect time with the Islanders.

References

External links

 Current New York Islanders roster at NHL.com
 All-time New York Islanders roster at NHL.com

New York Islanders
 
players